Calocephalus is a genus of flowering plants in the family Asteraceae. It is endemic to Australia, where it is represented in every state.

These are annual and perennial herbs and shrubs. The leaves are arranged alternately or oppositely, or both. The herbage is hairy. Flower heads occur at the tips of the stems. There are one to 22 tubular disc florets per head. The fruit is a cypsela with a pappus of narrow scales or simple or plume-like bristles.

 Species

 Calocephalus aervoides (F.Muell.) Benth. – woolly beauty-heads                 
 Calocephalus citreus Less. – lemon beauty-heads              
 Calocephalus francisii (F.Muell.) Benth. – fine-leaf beauty-heads             
 Calocephalus knappii (F.Muell.) Ewart & Jean White      
 Calocephalus lacteus Less. – milky beauty-heads   
 Calocephalus lessingii Ewart
 Calocephalus multiflorus (Turcz.) Benth. – yellow-top  
 Calocephalus platycephalus (F.Muell.) Benth. – billybuttons, yellow top, western beauty-heads
 Calocephalus sonderi F.Muell. – pale beauty-heads

References

External links
 
 Calocephalus. FloraBase - the Western Australian Flora.

Gnaphalieae
Asteraceae genera
Asterales of Australia
Taxa named by Robert Brown (botanist, born 1773)